The 1960 Cal Poly Mustangs football team represented California Polytechnic State College—now known as California Polytechnic State University, San Luis Obispo—as a member of the California Collegiate Athletic Association (CCAA) during the 1960 NCAA College Division football season. Led by 11th-year head coach LeRoy Hughes, Cal Poly compiled an overall record of 1–5 with a mark of 1–2 in conference play, placing fourth in the CCAA. The Mustangs played home games at Mustang Stadium in San Luis Obispo, California. 

Tragedy struck following the game at Bowling Green State University on October 29, when a plane leaving Toledo Airport crashed killing 22 people, including 16 Cal Poly Mustang football players and the team manager. The following year, a benefit game was held to raise a memorial fund for the survivors and bereaved families. It was called the Mercy Bowl and was held at the Los Angeles Memorial Coliseum in Los Angeles. The game between Fresno State and Bowling Green on November 23, 1961 raised more than $200,000.

Schedule

Notes

References

Cal Poly
Cal Poly Mustangs football seasons
Cal Poly Mustangs football